Glenn Eric Andre Diesen (born 1979) is a Norwegian political scientist who is a specialist on Russian Foreign Policy and Geopolitics.
Diesen is an expert commentator on Russian matters. He has published articles in the state-controlled Russia Today and the alternative news site Steigan.no.

From 2018 to 2020 he was a professor at the Higher School of Economics in Moscow.
In 2020 he joined the University of Southeast Norway and in 2021 became professor at the Department of Business, History and Social Sciences.

Career

Diesen earned a PhD from the Vrije Universiteit Amsterdam with a dissertation titled Inter-democratic security institutions and the security dilemma. He was formerly based in Russia and employed by the Moscow-based Higher School of Economics, and is now a professor at the University of South-Eastern Norway. He states that he specializes in Russian foreign policy, conservatism and Eurasian integration, and has written several books. He is affiliated with the Valdai Discussion Club, a Russian think tank that is closely associated with Vladimir Putin.

Views on Russia
Diesen is widely known as a broadcaster and regular commentator on Russia Today (RT), and has been widely described by anti-Russian Scandinavian media and academics as promoting Russian propaganda. He also writes for Steigan, a self-described "anti-globalist" website that is known for publishing conspiracy theories and pro-Russian views, and has claimed that the West is responsible for an information war against Russia. Patrik Oksanen considered Diesen to be "part of the Russian propaganda machinery." Aage Borchgrevink of the Norwegian Helsinki Committee said that Diesen has "an important role in RT as the Western expert, which gives legitimacy to what clearly appears to be the Kremlin's version [...] his writings are unreliable, the factual basis is doubtful, and characterized by the content and form of Russian propaganda, as expressed in RT and Sputnik."

In 2020, Diesen wrote an op-ed in Aftenposten with Arne Treholt, who was convicted of treason for spying for the Soviet Union during the Cold War, that claimed that Russia has "legitimate interests and security needs" and claimed that Russia was unfairly demonized as a security threat. The paper's foreign affairs editor Kjell Dragnes wrote that Diesen and Treholt promoted Russian propaganda.

Selected bibliography

Glenn Diesen (2017). Russia's Geoeconomic Strategy for a Greater Eurasia. Routledge. ISBN 9780415791687.
Glenn Diesen (2017). EU and NATO Relations with Russia. Routledge. s. 240. ISBN 9781138063273.
Glenn Diesen (2020). The Decay of Western Civilisation and Resurgence of Russia. Routledge. ISBN 9780367587383.
Glenn Diesen; Alexander Lukin (2020). Russia in a Changing World. Springer Verlag, Singapore. ISBN 9789811518942.
Glenn Diesen (2021). Europe As the Western Peninsula of Greater Eurasia. Rowman Littlefield. ISBN 9781538161760.
Glenn Diesen (2021). Russian Conservatism. Rowman Littlefield. ISBN 9781538149980.
Glenn Diesen (2021). Great Power Politics in the Fourth Industrial Revolution. I.B. Tauris. ISBN 9781538149980.
Glenn Diesen; Alexander Lukin (2021). The Return of Eurasia. Palgrave Macmillan. ISBN 9789811621789.
Glenn Diesen (2022). Russophobia: Propaganda in International Politics. Springer Singapore. ISBN 9789811914676.

See also
Propaganda in the Russian Federation
RT (TV network)

References

1979 births

Living people
Norwegian political scientists
Russian propagandists
RT (TV network) people